Isfara is a city in Sughd Region in northern Tajikistan, situated on the border with Kyrgyzstan. The city was the seat of the former Isfara District.

There are currently territorial disputes between Tajikistan and Kyrgyzstan over the area of Isfara Valley.

History

The first author who mentions Esfara as a town, is Bābor. He praised the orchards and fruits of Isfara, especially its almonds. The 16th century saw the construction of large public buildings, notably mosques and medreseh. In the 18th century Isfara was the seat of the Khan of Ḵoqand whose wars with Bokhara resulted in the destruction of some historical monuments.

Around 20 km south, in the village of Chorku, the mausoleum Hazrati Shoh Mausoleum, is carved from wood, partly dating back to the 8th century, a structure that is unique in Central Asia.

Demographics
The population of Isfara is mostly Tajik.

Geography
Isfara is situated near the border junction of three independent states Tajikistan, Uzbekistan and Kyrgyzstan, at a height of 863m above sea level. The river Isfara flows through the city. Its territory is 832 km2.

Climate
The average temperature is 11.8 °C (53.2 °F) with the warmest month being July with an average temperature of 25 °C (77 °F) and the coldest month being January with an average temperature of -2.7 °C (27.1 °F). The average amount of precipitation is 544.6mm (21.4") and there are on average 74.3 days of participation.

Subdivisions
Before ca. 2018, Isfara was the seat of Isfara District, which covered the same area as the present city of Isfara. The city of Isfara covers Isfara proper, three towns and nine jamoats. These are as follows:

Economy

Some 20 industrial companies in Isfara produce electrical equipment, chemical and metallurgical products, construction materials, food products and others.

Isfara is famous for its apricot orchards.

See also
 List of cities in Tajikistan

References 

Populated places in Sughd Region
Cities in Central Asia
Kyrgyzstan–Tajikistan border crossings